Silver Creek is a stream in southwestern Randolph County and the southeast corner of Chariton County in north central Missouri. It is a tributary of the East Fork Little Chariton River with the confluence in Chariton County. The headwaters of Silver Creek are just northwest of Higbee.

Silver Creek was so named because of its clean water.

See also
List of rivers of Missouri

References

Rivers of Chariton County, Missouri
Rivers of Randolph County, Missouri
Rivers of Missouri